The Choir Invisible is a  novel by James Lane Allen published in 1897.  A bestseller, it was the second-best selling book in the United States for 1897. 

A poignant love story, it is set in Kentucky in 1795 and begins with a portion of the poem "Choir Invisible" by George Eliot. Though criticized for lacking depth, being full of digressions, and "artistically disappointing", it was his most popular novel. An 1897 review in The Atlantic Monthly faulted the book for its "meagre" structure, yet praised its tone and style. The book is often regarded as Allen's best work.

The novel was developed from a novelette Allen published in 1893 titled "John Gray: A Kentucky Tale of the Olden Time".

References

External links
The Choir Invisible (full scan, via Google books)
Review from 1897 finding beauty in the book but faulting it for lack of balance

1897 American novels
Novels set in Kentucky